The Technical Advisory Council (TAC) is a federal advisory committee of the Federal Communications Commission and the FCC's Office of Engineering and Technology (OET). Its mandate is to provide the FCC with technical advice in such rapidly growing fields as cable television, telephony, and the Internet.

History 

TAC held its first meeting on April 17, 2003, under the leadership of TAC Chairman Dr. Robert Lucky, a former Bell Labs researcher.

Members 

TAC is primarily composed of representatives from major American telecommunications and media corporations. The current committee, TAC IV, was created on November 19, 2004, and has members from such companies as Cisco, Sprint, Motorola, Google, Comcast, Microsoft, HP, Verizon, Qualcomm, Fox, Bellsouth, and Apple Computer.

Vint Cerf, the co-creator of the Internet protocol TCP/IP, has served on several instances of the committee.

External links 

 OET Technical Advisory Council
 TAC IV Members

American advisory organizations
Federal Communications Commission